In mathematics, particularly in linear algebra, matrix multiplication is a binary operation that produces a matrix from two matrices. For matrix multiplication, the number of columns in the first matrix must be equal to the number of rows in the second matrix. The resulting matrix, known as the matrix product, has the number of rows of the first and the number of columns of the second matrix.

Matrix multiplication was first described by the French mathematician Jacques Philippe Marie Binet in 1812, to represent the composition of linear maps that are represented by matrices. Matrix multiplication is thus a basic tool of linear algebra, and as such has numerous applications in many areas of mathematics, as well as in applied mathematics, statistics, physics, economics, and engineering.
Computing matrix products is a central operation in all computational applications of linear algebra.

Notation
Index notation is often the clearest way to express definitions, and is used as standard in the literature. In contrast, a single subscript, e.g. , is used to select a matrix (not a matrix entry) from a collection of matrices.

Definition

the matrix product  (denoted without multiplication signs or dots) is defined to be the  matrix

such that 

Therefore,  can also be written as

In most scenarios, the entries are numbers, but they may be any kind of mathematical objects for which an addition and a multiplication are defined, that are associative, and such that the addition is commutative, and the multiplication is distributive with respect to the addition. In particular, the entries may be matrices themselves (see block matrix).

Illustration 

The values at the intersections, marked with circles in figure to the right, are:

Fundamental applications

Historically, matrix multiplication has been introduced for facilitating and clarifying computations in linear algebra. This strong relationship between matrix multiplication and linear algebra remains fundamental in all mathematics, as well as in physics, chemistry, engineering and computer science.

Linear maps
If a vector space has a finite basis, its vectors are each uniquely represented by a finite sequence of scalars, called a coordinate vector, whose elements are the coordinates of the vector on the basis. These coordinate vectors form another vector space, which is isomorphic to the original vector space. A coordinate vector is commonly organized as a column matrix (also called column vector), which is a matrix with only one column. So, a column vector represents both a coordinate vector, and a vector of the original vector space.

A linear map  from a vector space of dimension  into a vector space of dimension  maps a column vector

onto the column vector

The linear map  is thus defined by the matrix 

and maps the column vector  to the matrix product 

Geometric rotations
Using a Cartesian coordinate system in a Euclidean plane, the rotation by an angle  around the origin is a linear map.
More precisely, 

where the source point  and its image  are written as column vectors.

where appropriate trigonometric identities are employed for the second equality.
That is, the composition corresponds to the rotation by angle , as expected.

Resource allocation in economics

As an example, a fictitious factory uses 4 kinds of basic commodities,  to produce 3 kinds of intermediate goods, which in turn are used to produce 3 kinds of final products, . The matrices 
   and   
provide the amount of basic commodities needed for a given amount of intermediate goods, and the amount of intermediate goods needed for a given amount of final products, respectively.

Using matrix multiplication, compute 

this matrix directly provides the amounts of basic commodities needed for given amounts of final goods.

Similarly, the product matrix  can be used to compute the needed amounts of basic goods for other final-good amount data.

System of linear equations
The general form of a system of linear equations is

Using same notation as above, such a system is equivalent with the single matrix equation

Dot product, bilinear form and sesquilinear form 
The dot product of two column vectors is the unique entry of the matrix product 

where  is the row vector obtained by transposing .  (As usual, a 1×1 matrix is identified with its unique entry.)

More generally, any bilinear form over a vector space of finite dimension may be expressed as a matrix product

and any sesquilinear form may be expressed as 

General properties
Matrix multiplication shares some properties with usual multiplication. However, matrix multiplication is not defined if the number of columns of the first factor differs from the number of rows of the second factor, and it is non-commutative, even when the product remains defined after changing the order of the factors.

Non-commutativity 
An operation is commutative if, given two elements  and  such that the product  is defined, then  is also defined, and 

Therefore, if one of the products is defined, the other one need not be defined. If , the two products are defined, but have different sizes; thus they cannot be equal. Even in this case, one has in general
 
For example

but

If, instead of a field, the entries are supposed to belong to a ring, then one must add the condition that  belongs to the center of the ring.

Again, if the matrices are over a general ring rather than a field, the corresponding entries in each must also commute with each other for this to hold.

Distributivity
The matrix product is distributive with respect to matrix addition.

and (right distributivity)

This results from the distributivity for coefficients by

Product with a scalar
If the scalars have the commutative property, then 

If the product  is defined (that is, the number of columns of  equals the number of rows of ), then 
 and 
If the scalars have the commutative property, then all four matrices are equal. More generally, all four are equal if  belongs to the center of a ring containing the entries of the matrices, because in this case,  for all matrices .

These properties result from the bilinearity of the product of scalars:

Transpose
If the scalars have the commutative property, the transpose of a product of matrices is the product, in the reverse order, of the transposes of the factors. That is 

where T denotes the transpose, that is the interchange of rows and columns.

Complex conjugate
If  and  have complex entries, then

where  denotes the entry-wise complex conjugate of a matrix.

This results from applying to the definition of matrix product the fact that the conjugate of a sum is the sum of the conjugates of the summands and the conjugate of a product is the product of the conjugates of the factors.

Transposition acts on the indices of the entries, while conjugation acts independently on the entries themselves. It results that, if  and  have complex entries, one has

where  denotes the conjugate transpose (conjugate of the transpose, or equivalently transpose of the conjugate).

Associativity 
In this case, one has the associative property

As for any associative operation, this allows omitting parentheses, and writing the above products as 

This extends naturally to the product of any number of matrices provided that the dimensions match.

is defined and does not depend on the order of the multiplications, if the order of the matrices is kept fixed.

These properties may be proved by straightforward but complicated summation manipulations. This result also follows from the fact that matrices represent linear maps. Therefore, the associative property of matrices is simply a specific case of the associative property of function composition.

Computational complexity depends on parenthezation 

Although the result of a sequence of matrix products does not depend on the order of operation (provided that the order of the matrices is not changed), the computational complexity may depend dramatically on this order.

Algorithms have been designed for choosing the best order of products, see Matrix chain multiplication. When the number  of matrices increases, it has been shown that the choice of the best order has a complexity of

Application to similarity
Any invertible matrix  defines a similarity transformation (on square matrices of the same size as )

Similarity transformations map product to products, that is 

In fact, one has

Square matrices
Let us denote  the set of  square matrices with entries in a ring , which, in practice, is often a field.

In , the product is defined for every pair of matrices. This makes  a ring, which has the identity matrix  as identity element (the matrix whose diagonal entries are equal to 1 and all other entries are 0). This ring is also an associative -algebra.

If , many matrices do not have a multiplicative inverse. For example, a matrix such that all entries of a row (or a column) are 0 does not have an inverse. If it exists, the inverse of a matrix  is denoted , and, thus verifies

A matrix that has an inverse is an invertible matrix. Otherwise, it is a singular matrix.

A product of matrices is invertible if and only if each factor is invertible. In this case, one has

When  is commutative, and, in particular, when it is a field, the determinant of a product is the product of the determinants. As determinants are scalars, and scalars commute, one has thus 

The other matrix invariants do not behave as well with products. Nevertheless, if  is commutative,  and  have the same trace, the same characteristic polynomial, and the same eigenvalues with the same multiplicities. However, the eigenvectors are generally different if .

Powers of a matrix 
One may raise a square matrix to any nonnegative integer power multiplying it by itself repeatedly in the same way as for ordinary numbers. That is,

Computing the th power of a matrix needs  times the time of a single matrix multiplication, if it is done with the trivial algorithm (repeated multiplication). As this may be very time consuming, one generally prefers using exponentiation by squaring, which requires less than  matrix multiplications, and is therefore much more efficient.

An easy case for exponentiation is that of a diagonal matrix. Since the product of diagonal matrices amounts to simply multiplying corresponding diagonal elements together, the th power of a diagonal matrix is obtained by raising the entries to the power :

Abstract algebra
The definition of matrix product requires that the entries belong to a semiring, and does not require multiplication of elements of the semiring to be commutative. In many applications, the matrix elements belong to a field, although the tropical semiring is also a common choice for graph shortest path problems. Even in the case of matrices over fields, the product is not commutative in general, although it is associative and is distributive over matrix addition. The identity matrices (which are the square matrices whose entries are zero outside of the main diagonal and 1 on the main diagonal) are identity elements of the matrix product. It follows that the  matrices over a ring form a ring, which is noncommutative except if  and the ground ring is commutative.

A square matrix may have a multiplicative inverse, called an inverse matrix. The determinant of a product of square matrices is the product of the determinants of the factors. The  matrices that have an inverse form a group under matrix multiplication, the subgroups of which are called matrix groups. Many classical groups (including all finite groups) are isomorphic to matrix groups; this is the starting point of the theory of group representations.

Computational complexity

The matrix multiplication algorithm that results from the definition requires, in the worst case,  multiplications and  additions of scalars to compute the product of two square  matrices. Its computational complexity is therefore , in a model of computation for which the scalar operations take constant time.

Rather surprisingly, this complexity is not optimal, as shown in 1969 by Volker Strassen, who provided an algorithm, now called Strassen's algorithm, with a complexity of 
Strassen's algorithm can be parallelized to further improve the performance.
, the best matrix multiplication algorithm is by Josh Alman and Virginia Vassilevska Williams and has complexity .
It is not known whether matrix multiplication can be performed in  time. This would be optimal, since one must read the  elements of a matrix in order to multiply it with another matrix.

Since matrix multiplication forms the basis for many algorithms, and many operations on matrices even have the same complexity as matrix multiplication (up to a multiplicative constant), the computational complexity of matrix multiplication appears throughout numerical linear algebra and theoretical computer science.

Generalizations
Other types of products of matrices include:
Block matrix multiplication
Cracovian product, defined as 
Frobenius inner product, the dot product of matrices considered as vectors, or, equivalently the sum of the entries of the Hadamard product
Hadamard product of two matrices of the same size, resulting in a matrix of the same size, which is the product entry-by-entry
Kronecker product or tensor product, the generalization to any size of the preceding 
Khatri-Rao product and Face-splitting product
Outer product, also called dyadic product or tensor product of two column matrices, which is 
Scalar multiplication

See also
Matrix calculus, for the interaction of matrix multiplication with operations from calculus

Notes

References 

 Henry Cohn, Robert Kleinberg, Balázs Szegedy, and Chris Umans. Group-theoretic Algorithms for Matrix Multiplication. . Proceedings of the 46th Annual Symposium on Foundations of Computer Science, 23–25 October 2005, Pittsburgh, PA, IEEE Computer Society, pp. 379–388.
 Henry Cohn, Chris Umans. A Group-theoretic Approach to Fast Matrix Multiplication. . Proceedings of the 44th Annual IEEE Symposium on Foundations of Computer Science, 11–14 October 2003, Cambridge, MA, IEEE Computer Society, pp. 438–449.
 
 
 Knuth, D.E., The Art of Computer Programming Volume 2: Seminumerical Algorithms. Addison-Wesley Professional; 3 edition (November 14, 1997). . pp. 501.
 .
 Ran Raz. On the complexity of matrix product. In Proceedings of the thirty-fourth annual ACM symposium on Theory of computing. ACM Press, 2002. .
 Robinson, Sara, Toward an Optimal Algorithm for Matrix Multiplication, SIAM News 38(9), November 2005. PDF
 Strassen, Volker, Gaussian Elimination is not Optimal, Numer. Math. 13, p. 354-356, 1969.
 
 

Matrix theory
Bilinear maps
Multiplication
Numerical linear algebra